Pedro Callá (born 1 January 1934) is an Argentine former footballer. He played in twelve matches for the Argentina national football team from 1959 to 1962. He was also part of Argentina's squad for the 1959 South American Championship that took place in Argentina.

References

External links
 

1934 births
Living people
Argentine footballers
Argentina international footballers
Place of birth missing (living people)
Association football forwards
Argentinos Juniors footballers
Club Atlético Vélez Sarsfield footballers
Boca Juniors footballers
The Strongest players
Racing Club de Montevideo players
Club Universitario de Deportes footballers
Argentine expatriate footballers
Expatriate footballers in Bolivia
Expatriate footballers in Uruguay
Expatriate footballers in Peru